Dan Starkey (born 27 September 1977) is an English actor known for making numerous appearances in the BBC One science-fiction TV series Doctor Who. He has portrayed a number of different Sontaran characters, most notably Strax, who has come across the Eleventh and Twelfth incarnations of the Doctor, played by Matt Smith and Peter Capaldi respectively. In 2016 joined the CBBC sketch show, Class Dismissed and has appeared in 36 episodes (every episode of Series 1,2 & 3) He left the show after Series 3.

Early life
He studied at Trinity Hall, Cambridge and graduated in Anglo-Saxon, Norse and Celtic before training at the Bristol Old Vic (graduating in 2006).

Career
He played the enraged loner Simon in Muswell Hill by Torben Betts at Richmond's Orange Tree Theatre (Feb/March 2012) and was nominated as Best Male Performance at the 2012 Off West End Theatre Awards (Offies). In November 2013 Starkey appeared in the one-off 50th anniversary comedy homage The Five(ish) Doctors Reboot.

University Challenge
On 2 January 2015, Starkey was a member of the winning team on Christmas University Challenge, representing Trinity Hall, Cambridge who defeated Balliol College, Oxford, the University of Edinburgh and the University of Hull. His team-mates were international rower Tom James, world champion cyclist Emma Pooley and novelist Adam Mars-Jones.

Filmography

Film

Television

Video games

Theatre credits

The 39 Steps UK national tour
 The Fitzrovia Radio Hour
 Muswell Hill by Torben Betts, Orange Tree Theatre, Richmond
 Making News by Robert Khan and Tom Salinsky, Pleasance One Theatre, Edinburgh Fringe Festival

CD audio dramas

References

External links

1977 births
Living people
21st-century British male actors
Audiobook narrators
British male film actors
British male stage actors
British male television actors
British male voice actors
Alumni of Bristol Old Vic Theatre School
Alumni of Trinity Hall, Cambridge